A national referendum was called on December 16–17, 1977 where the majority of the voters voted that President Ferdinand Marcos should continue in office as incumbent President and Prime Minister after the organization of the Interim Batasang Pambansa.

Results

See also
Commission on Elections
Politics of the Philippines
Philippine elections
Suffrage

External links
 Presidential Decree No. 1229, s. 1977
Official website of the Commission on Elections

Referendums in the Philippines
1977 elections in the Philippines
1977 referendums
Presidency of Ferdinand Marcos